Mihaela is a female given name with the same etymology as Michaela. It is very common in Romania, and also found in Croatia and Bulgaria. 

Notable people with the name include:
Mihaela Bene (born 1973), Romanian sprint canoer
Mihaela Botezan (born 1976), Romanian long-distance runner
Mihaela Buzărnescu (born 1988), Romanian tennis player
Mihaela Chiras (born 1984),Romanian luger
Mihaela Ciobanu (born 1973), Romanian-born Spanish handball goalkeeper
Mihaela Dascălu (born 1970), retired Romanian speed skater
Mihaela Horvat (born 1994), Croatian football player
Mihaela Lazić (born 2000), Croatian basketball player
Mihaela Loghin (born 1952), retired shot putter
Mihaela Melinte (born 1975), Romanian hammer thrower
Mihaela Miroiu (born 1955), Romanian political theorist and feminist philosopher
Mihaela Mitrache or Mitraki (1955–2008), Romanian actress
Mihaela Peneş (born 1947), retired Romanian track and field athlete
Mihaela Pohoață (born 1981), Romanian aerobic gymnast
Mihaela Runceanu (1955–1989), Romanian pop singer and vocal techniques teacher
Mihaela Ani Senocico (born 1981), Romanian handball player
Mihaela Stănuleţ (born 1966), Romanian artistic gymnast
Mihaela Tivadar (born 1982), Romanian handball player

See also
 Mihael
 Mihail
  

Romanian feminine given names
Croatian feminine given names